Marie Bernays (13 May 188322 April 1939) was a German politician, educator, writer and women's rights activist. She co-founded the Mannheim Women's Social School and served in the Landtag of the Republic of Baden from 1921 until 1925 as a member of the Deutsche Volkspartei.

Biography
Bernays was born in Munich in 1883 and moved with her family to Karlsruhe in 1890. The family moved again in 1905 to Heidelberg, where Bernays sat her Abitur at the humanities-oriented Humanistisches Gymnasium in 1906. From 1906 to 1912, she studied economics at Heidelberg University. Bernays' family was Jewish but converted to Protestantism; her father, Michael Bernays, was a professor of literary history at the University of Munich, and her mother was Louise née Rübke.

Together with Elisabeth Altmann-Gottheiner, Julie Bassermann and Alice Bensheimer, in 1916 she founded the Mannheim Soziale Frauenschule (Women's Social School), and from 1919 to 1932 Bernays served as the school's director. She collaborated with the communist revolutionary Eugen Leviné in 1919 to host discussion evenings in Heidelberg. In 1920, she stood as a candidate for the Deutsche Volkspartei (DVP; German People's Party) in the Weimar Reichstag elections; she appeared at fourteenth on the party's national list. She was elected to the Baden Landtag – the parliament of the Republic of Baden – in 1921 and held her seat until 1925. She wrote many articles and pamphlets on topics including women's role in a democratic society, child-rearing, and social welfare.

In 1933, distressed by the rise of Nazism and the DVP's shift towards right-wing politics, she entered a convent and converted to Roman Catholicism. She died of natural causes in 1939 in Beuron.

Bibliography

References

Further reading

External links

 

1883 births
1939 deaths
20th-century German educators
20th-century German women writers
20th-century German writers
Converts to Roman Catholicism from Protestantism
German People's Party politicians
German people of Jewish descent
German Roman Catholics
German women's rights activists
Heidelberg University alumni
Jewish German politicians
Jewish women politicians
Ministers of the Baden State Government
Politicians from Heidelberg